Red Oak Municipal Airport  is a city-owned public-use airport located two nautical miles (3.7 km) west of the central business district of Red Oak, a city in Montgomery County, Iowa, United States. According to the FAA's National Plan of Integrated Airport Systems for 2009–2013, it is categorized as a general aviation facility.

Although many U.S. airports use the same three-letter location identifier for the FAA and IATA, this facility is assigned RDK by the FAA but has no designation from the IATA.

Facilities and aircraft 
It has three concrete paved runways: 5/23 is 5,100 by 75 feet (1,554 x 23 m) and 17/35 is 2,901 by 60 feet (884 x 18 m). It also has a turf runway designated 13/31 which is 2,050 by 210 feet (625 x 64 m).

For the 12-month period ending August 8, 2007, the airport had 11,550 general aviationaircraft operations, an average of 31 per day. At that time there were 34 aircraft based at this airport: 79% single-engine, 3% multi-engine and 18% ultralight.

References

External links 
 Aerial image as of 11 October 1994 from USGS The National Map
 

Airports in Iowa
Transportation buildings and structures in Montgomery County, Iowa